Kufstein (Central Bavarian: Kufstoa) is a town in the Austrian state of Tyrol, the administrative seat of Kufstein District. With a population of about 19,600 it is the second largest Tyrolean town after the state capital Innsbruck. The greatest landmark is Kufstein Fortress, first mentioned in the 13th century. The town was the place of origin of the Austrian noble family Kuefstein.

Geography
It is located in the Tyrolean Unterland region on the river Inn, at the confluence with its Weißache and Kaiserbach tributaries, near the border with Bavaria, Germany. The municipal area stretches along the Lower Inn Valley between the Brandenberg Alps in the northwest and the Kaiser Mountains in the southeast. The remote Kaisertal until recently was the last settled valley in Austria without transport connections, prior to the completion of a tunnel road from Kufstein to neighbouring Ebbs in 2008. North of the town, the Inn river leaves the Northern Limestone Alps and enters the Bavarian Alpine Foreland. The town area comprises several small lakes, such as Pfrillsee, Längsee, and Hechtsee; Egelsee and Maistaller Lacke are protected nature reserves.

The municipal arrangement comprises the cadastral communities of Kufstein, Morsbach and Thierberg; the town itself is divided into five quarters (Zentrum, Sparchen, Weissach, Endach, and Zell).

Climate

Population

Economy
Glass manufacturer Riedel, haulage contractor  LKW Walter, gunmaker Voere, and textile mat manufacturer Kleen-Tex are based in Kufstein.

Kufstein is also home to the University of Applied Sciences Kufstein which specializes in providing business education and is a center for international exchange.

Transport

Kufstein has two exits along the A12 motorway (autobahn) from Innsbruck to Rosenheim.

Kufstein railway station, opened in 1876, forms part of the Lower Inn Valley railway section of the Brenner-axis from Munich to Verona.

The Festungsbahn is a funicular that links the city centre with the Kufstein Fortress.

History
Archaeological findings in the Tischofer Cave in Kaisertal denote a settlement of the area more than 30,000 years ago, the oldest traces of human habitation in Tyrol. Incorporated into the Roman Empire in 15 BC, the Inn river formed the border between the Roman provinces of Raetia and Noricum.

A church at Caofstein was first mentioned in a 788 deed issued by Bishop Arno of Salzburg. At that time, the Lower Inn Valley was part of the Bavarian realm under the Agilolfing duke Tassilo III, who was deposed by Charlemagne and replaced by Prefect Gerold. The Fortress is first documented in 1205 as a possession of the Bishop of Regensburg and the Duke of Bavaria.

In the early 14th century, the Wittelsbach emperor Louis IV, also Bavarian duke, vested the Kufstein citizens with rights of jurisdiction. Kufstein passed to the County of Tyrol in 1342, when it was a wedding gift to Countess Margaret from her husband, Emperor Louis's son Louis the Brandenburger. However, it fell back to Bavaria upon Margaret's death in 1369. Duke Stephen III of Bavaria granted Kufstein city status in 1393, due to its prominence as a trading and docking point on the Inn River. From 1415 onwards, his son and successor Duke Louis VII had the Fortress largely rebuilt and expanded.

The possession of the strategically important Kufstein border fortress remained disputed. In 1504, the Habsburg emperor Maximilian I took the opportunity of the War of the Succession of Landshut within the Bavarian Wittelsbach dynasty: his Austrian forces laid siege to the town, and at the Imperial Diet in Cologne the next year, the emperor resolved upon the cession of the Kufstein territories to the Habsburg lands of Tyrol. Maximilian had the prominent Kaiserturm tower of the fortress erected, which was finished in 1522.

During the War of the Spanish Succession, the castle was again besieged by Bavarian troops under Elector Maximilian II Emanuel in 1703, nevertheless the Austrian domains were confirmed by the Treaty of Ilbersheim the next year. After the War of the Third Coalition, Kufstein once again was awarded to the newly established Kingdom of Bavaria in the 1805 Peace of Pressburg and the Tyrolean Rebellion of 1809 was crushed by the Bavarian Army. Finally in 1813/14 it passed to the Austrian Empire.

In the 19th century, Kufstein Fortress was turned into a bastille for political prisoners, such as the Hungarian outlaw Sándor Rózsa, who spent several years here before he was finally pardoned in 1868. The town's economic development was decisively promoted by the opening of the Lower Inn Valley Railway line in 1858.

In the late days of World War II the historic town centre suffered from Allied bombing. After the war, Kufstein was occupied by French and US forces; it was the site of a French sector United Nations Relief and Rehabilitation Administration Displaced Persons camp.

Sights 

Due to its long history, the city of Kufstein has various sights to offer:

Sometimes erroneously called Schloss Garoldseck, the fortress was mentioned as Castrum Caofstein in a document for the first time in 1205. It was enlarged several times. The most important tower, the round and impressive Kaiserturm, was built from 1518-22. Several times in its history, the fortress was used as a prison. Today it is famous for its large organ (Heldenorgel).
The old city center (Altstadt) with several picturesque lanes the most famous of which is Römerhofgasse.
The sightworthy City Hall (Rathaus) is on a square called  Stadtplatz.
Saint Vitus Church is the oldest church of Kufstein. It was built from 1390-1420 in a typical Gothic style. Later, it was converted into a baroque church from 1660-61.
A part of the medieval city wall is well preserved and worth a visit.  The sightworthy Wasserbastei is in the Northern part of the old city center on the river Inn. In the Southern part of the wall, a former gate called Auracher Löchl can be seen.

International relations

Twin towns — Sister cities

Kufstein is twinned with
 Frauenfeld, Switzerland
 Rovereto, Italy
 Langenlois, Austria

Notable people 

 Ferenc Kazinczy (1759–1831), author, the regenerator of the Hungarian language and literature
 Josef Madersperger (1768–1850), tailor and one of the inventors of the sewing machine
 Adele Stürzl (1892–1944), communist and resistance fighter against National Socialism
 Max Reisch (1912–1985), Orient-researcher and writer
 Claus Josef Riedel (1925–2004), entrepreneur and glass designer
 Cornelius Rost (1919–1983), Wehrmacht officer and a template for the novel  As far as your feet will carry 
 Christian Pravda (1927–1994), alpine skier
 Günter Pichler (born 1940), musician and professor
 Franz Schuler (born 1962), biathlete
 Manfred Linzmaier (born 1962), soccer player and team manager
 Armin Kircher (1966–2015), church musician and composer
 Markus Kronthaler (1967–2006), mountaineer and climber
 Karl Wendlinger (born 1968), racecar and Formula One driver
 Claus Dalpiaz (born 1971), ice hockey goaltender
 Leslie H. Sabo, Jr. (1948–1970), US-soldier, Medal of Honor recipient

In popular culture

Film and television
Locations in and around Kufstein have been used for a number of films and television programmes: Destiny (1942), Mountain Crystal (1949), Bluebeard (1951), White Shadows (1951), Das letzte Aufgebot (1953), The Flying Classroom (1954), Graf Porno und die liebesdurstigen Töchter (1969), Vanessa (1977), Sachrang (1978), TV documentary series Bilderbuch Deutschland (1996), Da wo das Glück beginnt (2006), Da wo es noch Treue gibt (2006), and Da wo die Freundschaft zahlt (2007). For further information see the Internet Movie Database.

Music
The song  (also called Das Kufsteiner Lied), originally composed by Karl Ganzer, has been covered by many musicians including Heino and Franzl Lang.

References

External links

 Official website 
 Kufstein Gigapixel Panorama (15.000 Megapixel)
 Kufstein webcam
 Kufstein Tourist Board
 www.heimat-kufstein.at: Historical pictures of Kufstein

 
Cities and towns in Kufstein District
Kufstein District
Populated places on the Inn (river)